Sitaphalmandi railway station is located on the Manmad–Kachiguda section of South Central Railway in Secunderabad, Telangana, India. The English and Foreign Languages University (CIEFL) and Tarnaka are accessible from this station.

Lines 
Hyderabad Multi-Modal Transport System
Secunderabad–Falaknuma route (SF line)

References 

MMTS stations in Hyderabad
Hyderabad railway division